The term prior may refer to:
 Prior (ecclesiastical), the head of a priory (monastery)
 Prior convictions, the life history and previous convictions of a suspect or defendant in a criminal case
 Prior probability, in Bayesian statistics
 Prior knowledge for pattern recognition
 Saint Prior (4th century), an Egyptian hermit and disciple of Anthony the Great
 Prior (surname)
 Prior (Stargate), a fictional race in the television series Stargate
 Prior (brand), a Norwegian brand of eggs and white meat
 Prior, Missouri, a community in the United States
 Prior Norge, a defunct Norwegian egg and white meat processing cooperative

See also
 A priori and a posteriori, two kinds of logical inference